Aeolochroma unitaria is a moth of the family Geometridae first described by Francis Walker in 1860. It is found in Tasmania, Australia.

References

Moths described in 1860
Pseudoterpnini
Moths of Australia